John Duckworth may refer to:

People
 Sir John Duckworth, 1st Baronet (1748–1817), British naval officer of the French Revolutionary and Napoleonic Wars
 Sir John Duckworth, 2nd Baronet (1809–1887), British Conservative politician
 John Duckworth (footballer) (born 1949), Australian rules footballer and Magarey Medallist
 John Duckworth (physicist) (1916–2015), British physicist
 John Duckworth (politician) (1863–1946), Member of Parliament for Blackburn

Characters
 Jack Duckworth, character in the British soap opera Coronation Street, played by William Tarmey

See also
Duckworth (surname)